Elenovo is a village in Blagoevgrad Municipality, in Blagoevgrad Province, Bulgaria.
It is situated in the foothills of Rila mountain and a kilometer east of Blagoevgrad.

References

Villages in Blagoevgrad Province